Hypleurochilus bermudensis, the barred blenny, is a species of combtooth blenny found in coral reefs in the western Atlantic ocean.  This species grows to a length of  TL.

References

bermudensis
Fauna of Bermuda
Fauna of the Bahamas
Fish described in 1933
Taxa named by William Beebe
Taxa named by John Tee-Van